The 1932–33 Yugoslav Football Championship (Serbo-Croato-Slovenian: Državno prvenstvo 1932/33 / Државно првенство 1932/33) was the 11th season of Kingdom of Yugoslavia's premier football competition.

League table

Results

Winning squad
Champions:

BSK Belgrade (coach: Sándor Nemes)

Franjo Glazer
Predrag Radovanović
Dragomir Tošić
Milorad Arsenijević
Ivan Stevović
Radivoj Božić
Ljubiša Đorđević
Aleksandar Tirnanić
Slavko Šurdonja
Kuzman Sotirović
Blagoje Marjanović
Djordje Vujadinović
Svetislav Glišović

Top scorers
Final goalscoring position, number of goals, player/players and club.
1 - 21 goals - Vladimir Kragić (Hajduk Split)
2 - 16 goals - Blagoje Marjanović (BSK Belgrade)
3 - 15 goals - Đorđe Vujadinović (BSK Belgrade)

See also
Yugoslav Cup
Yugoslav League Championship
Football Association of Yugoslavia

References

External links
Yugoslavia Domestic Football Full Tables

Yugoslav Football Championship
Yugo
1932–33 in Yugoslav football